Frieston is a village in the South Kesteven district of Lincolnshire, England. Frieston is conjoined to the southern part of the village of Caythorpe.

Frieston lies within Caythorpe civil parish. Local government has been arranged in this way since the reorganisation of 1 April 1974, which resulted from the 1972 Local Government Act. Hitherto, the parish had formed part of the Parts of Kesteven. Kesteven was one of the three divisions (formally known as parts) of the traditional county of Lincolnshire. Since the 1888 Local Government Act Kesteven had been, in most respects, a county in itself.

This seems to be an example of the migration of a village. 'Frieston' is a name which belongs to the 5th-century settlement of Britain by Anglo-Saxons, in this area mainly Angles, but in this case Frisians. The thorpe element of Caythorpe indicates a secondary settlement by Vikings, in this case probably Danes, at some time between 800 and 1050.

Notable people
Edmund Weaver, 18th-century astronomer and land agent, lived at Frieston. He was buried at St Vincent's Church, Caythorpe, where his memorial is placed in the south chancel.

References

External links

Villages in Lincolnshire
South Kesteven District